Pitchapa Phanthumchinda (born December 13, 1992 in Thailand), nickname Pear is a Thai model and actress.

Life 
Pitchapa was born on December 13, 1992 in Samut Prakan province in Thailand. She graduated from secondary education Assumption College, Samut Prakan and graduated with a bachelor's degree from the Faculty of Communication Arts Rangsit University (Film and Video).

Career 
Pitchapa entered the film industry after working in modeling, appearing in music videos and advertisements . She first appeared in an advertisement for Beauty Buffet, followed by magazine shoots. After appearing in a shoot for the magazine After, she was cast in a drama. After that, there was the first drama with Channel 3 by Pooh Dee E Sarn.

She also appears in Fai Lang Fai in the role of Pilai from Krong Kam.

Personal life 
Pitcha identifies as a Christian.

Filmography

Film

Television series

Music videos 
 เรื่องจริงเรื่องสุดท้าย (The Truth is the last problem) Jaruwat Cheawaram
 พรุ่งนี้ยังมีเหมือนเดิม (Tomorrow) Knomjean feat.WAii
 พูดไม่ค่อยถูก (I don't speak very well) ABnormal

MC
 Online 
 2021 : - ทางช่อง YouTube:ThreeSis Thesis คู่กับ Prima Bhuncharoen, การัญชิดา คุ้มสุวรรณ
 2022 : ดีต่อใจ ทางช่อง YouTube:ThreeSis Thesis คู่กับ Prima Bhuncharoen, การัญชิดา คุ้มสุวรรณ

Awards and nominations

References

External links 
 

1992 births
Living people
Pitchapa Phanthumchinda
Pitchapa Phanthumchinda
Pitchapa Phanthumchinda
Pitchapa Phanthumchinda
Pitchapa Phanthumchinda
Pitchapa Phanthumchinda
Pitchapa Phanthumchinda
Pitchapa Phanthumchinda
Thai television personalities
Pitchapa Phanthumchinda
Pitchapa Phanthumchinda